Shigeru Ohmori (Hepburn: , ; born 29 February 1980) is a Japanese video game director, designer, and developer best known for his work in the Pokémon franchise. He has worked in Game Freak since 2001, and has been the primary director of Pokémon video game titles since Pokémon Omega Ruby and Alpha Sapphire in 2014.

Career
Ohmori was born on 29 February 1980 in Matsudo city, in Chiba Prefecture. He went to a vocational school and studied programming, and before he had graduated he had worked on the commercial video game title Yakiniku Bugyou. He applied to Game Freak initially as a programmer, but according to Ohmori he found out he preferred video game design to programming, and instead applied to be a designer. The first title he worked on in Game Freak was Pokémon Ruby and Sapphire, immediately upon joining, and in the succeeding titles Pokémon Diamond and Pearl he was a lead designer.

According to Junichi Masuda, director of Pokémon titles before 2014, he appointed Ohmori to be his successor in directing future Pokémon games during the development for Pokémon X and Y. At that time, Ohmori was the games' design director. With fan requests for a remake of Ruby and Sapphire, Masuda opted for Ohmori due to Ohmori's strong connection with the old games, and Ohmori was informed of Masuda's decision on the games' tenth anniversary. The remake Pokémon Omega Ruby and Alpha Sapphire was released in 2014, and immediately after its development had concluded Ohmori reprised his directorial role for the 2016 titles Pokémon Sun and Moon.

Sun and Moon was Ohmori's first new-generation title as director. The games were themed around nature, and in its design Ohmori increased the emphasis the games gave towards the Pokémon creatures themselves. In an interview with USGamer, Ohmori also remarked that he wanted to design the new games "from scratch", and hence new game mechanics were introduced. In the following generation's titles, Pokémon Sword and Shield, Ohmori continued to become director. According to Ohmori, due to the Nintendo Switch's increased resolution, it became possible to include smaller visual items along with larger ones, enabling the addition of features such as multiplayer cooperative battles. One design item which took up Ohmori's attention was the grass in the games – as players perceived grass patches to be potential location for Pokémon, it was considered a core design element and Ohmori took half a year with his team to finalize it.

Ohmori retained his directorial position in the 2022 titles Pokémon Scarlet and Violet. The game continued to exclude voice acting as with previous titles, with Ohmori noting that without character voices "players can kind of create their own image of who that character is as they’re playing".

References

1980 births
Living people
People from Matsudo
Japanese video game directors
Japanese video game programmers
Nintendo people
Pokémon